Maravilha is a municipality located in the western of the Brazilian state of Alagoas. Its population is 9,004 (2020) and its area is 279 km2.

References

Municipalities in Alagoas